Lasaia sula, the blue metalmark, is a species of butterfly in the family Riodinidae that is native to North America. It ranges from the Lower Rio Grande Valley of Texas in the United States south to Honduras and inhabits subtropical forests, forest edges, and agricultural areas.

The top of the wings is metallic blue while the undersides are checker spotted and grayish brown. Caterpillars feed on Albizia species.

References

Riodinini
Butterflies described in 1888
Butterflies of Central America
Lepidoptera of Mexico
Butterflies of North America
Fauna of the Rio Grande valleys
Taxa named by Otto Staudinger